Usune may refer to:

Usune, Gunma, a village in Gunma Prefecture, Japan
Usune Masatoshi (born 1961), Japanese anime artist